Moriyama Station is the name of three train stations in Japan:

 Moriyama Station (Aichi) (守山駅)
 Moriyama Station (Nagasaki) (森山駅)
 Moriyama Station (Shiga) (守山駅)